was a Buddhist temple established during the Asuka period in Asuka, Nara Prefecture, Japan. Excavations have revealed a large-scale complex which included two kondō, a pagoda, extensive priests' quarters, and roof tiles that are "among the most beautiful ever made in Japan". The area has been designated a Historic Site and forms part of a grouping of sites submitted in 2007 for future inscription on the UNESCO World Heritage List: Asuka-Fujiwara: Archaeological sites of Japan’s Ancient Capitals and Related Properties. Related artefacts are displayed at the Asuka Historical Museum.

See also
 Asuka-Fujiwara
 Yamada-dera
 List of Important Cultural Properties of Japan (Asuka period: structures)
 Japanese Buddhist architecture

References

External links
 Kawara-dera (Asuka Historical Museum)

Buddhist temples in Nara Prefecture
Buddhist archaeological sites in Japan
Historic Sites of Japan
Asuka, Nara
Asuka period